General elections were held in Jamaica on 12 December 1944. The result was a victory for the Jamaica Labour Party, which won 22 of the 32 seats. Voter turnout was 58.7%.

Results

References

1944 in Jamaica
Elections in Jamaica
Jamaica